The 2023 Northwestern State Lady Demons softball team represents Northwestern State University during the 2023 NCAA Division I softball season. The Lady Demons play their home games at Lady Demon Diamond and are led by fifteenth year head coach Donald Pickett. They are members of the Southland Conference.

Preseason

Southland Conference Coaches Poll
The Southland Conference Coaches Poll was released on January 26, 2023. Northwestern State was picked to finish third in the Southland Conference with 91 votes.

Preseason All-Southland team
Two Lady Demons were named to the conference preseason first team, and three Lady Demons were named as second team members.

First Team
Crislyne Moreno (MCNS, SO, 1st Base)
Caleigh Cross  (MCNS, SR, 2nd Base)
Jil Poullard (MCNS, JR, 3rd Base)
Maddie Watson (SELA, SO, Shortstop)
Bailey Krolczyk (SELA, JR, Catcher)
Kaylee Lopez (MCNS, SR, Utility)
Audrey Greely (SELA, JR, Designated Player)
Laney Roos (NSU, JR, Outfielder)
Alayis Seneca (MCNS, SR, Outfielder)
Cam Goodman (SELA, JR, Outfielder)
Ashley Vallejo (MCNS, JR, Pitcher)
Bronte Rhoden (NSU, SR, Pitcher)

Second Team
Sydney Hoyt (TAMUCC, JR, 1st Base)
Madison Rayner (SELA, SR, 2nd Base)
Haylie Savage (HCU, SO, 3rd Base)
Ryleigh Mata (UIW, SO, Shortstop)
Tristin Court (NSU, JR, Catcher)
Melise Gossen (NICH, SR, Utility)
Chloe Gomez (MCNS, JR, Designated Player)
Alexa Poche (NICH, JR, Outfielder)
Makenzie Chaffin (NSU, JR, Outfielder)
Bailie Ragsdale (NSU, SO, Outfielder)
Lyndie Swanson (HCU, JR, Pitcher)
Siarah Galvan  (TAMUCC, SO, Pitcher)

Roster

Schedule and results

Schedule Source:*Rankings are based on the team's current ranking in the NFCA/USA Softball poll.

References

Northwestern State
Northwestern State Lady Demons softball
Northwestern State Lady Demons softball